Hulun Lake (Хөлөн нуур, lit. foot lake) or Dalai Nor ( Далай нуур, lit. ocean lake), is a large lake in the Inner Mongolia region of northern China.

Geography
It is one of the five largest freshwater lakes in all of China, covering approximately 2,339 km2.

The lake is not far from Manzhouli, which is on a major passenger rail-line.  Although there are several villages nearby, Manzhouli is the nearest city of notable size.

Amur Basin 

Economy
As in 1995 annual fish production was about 7,000 tons, 100 tons of shrimp, 4 kilograms of pearls, 1.5 million crayfish.

Hulun Lake is also one of the key reed production areas in China.

Recreation 
The lake and lakeshore is a tourist destination during the summer. During the other seasons there are few visitors. Hulun Lake and its wetlands are a Biosphere reserve of China.

See also

References

External links

Lakes of Inner Mongolia
Endorheic lakes of Asia
Amur basin
Biosphere reserves of China
Ramsar sites in China
Tourist attractions in Inner Mongolia